Pedro Gómez de Córdoba, O.S.H.  or Jerónimo Gómez Fernández de Córdoba or Pedro Gómez Fernández de Córdoba or Gómez Fernández de Córdoba y Santillán (died July 1598) was a Roman Catholic prelate who served as Bishop of Santiago de Guatemala (1574–1598)
and Bishop of Nicaragua (1568–1574).

Biography
Pedro Gómez de Córdoba was born in Granada, Spain and ordained a priest in the Order of Saint Jerome. On 2 June 1568, he was appointed during the papacy of Pope Pius V as Bishop of Nicaragua. On 18 June 1574, he was appointed during the papacy of Pope Gregory XIII as Bishop of Santiago de Guatemala where he served until his death in July 1598.

References

External links and additional sources
 (for Chronology of Bishops) 
 (for Chronology of Bishops) 
 (for Chronology of Bishops) 
 (for Chronology of Bishops) 

16th-century Roman Catholic bishops in Nicaragua
Bishops appointed by Pope Pius V
Bishops appointed by Pope Gregory XIII
1598 deaths
Hieronymite bishops
16th-century Roman Catholic bishops in Guatemala
Roman Catholic bishops of León in Nicaragua
Roman Catholic bishops of Guatemala (pre-1743)